RC Hamme is a Belgian rugby club in Hamme.

External links
 RC Hamme

Belgian rugby union clubs
RC Hamme